Kołaczkowice may refer to the following places:
Kołaczkowice, Greater Poland Voivodeship (west-central Poland)
Kołaczkowice, Silesian Voivodeship (south Poland)
Kołaczkowice, Świętokrzyskie Voivodeship (south-central Poland)